Lucia Magano Iipumbu (born 20 November 1975 in Onamenga near Elim) is a Namibian politician. A member pf SWAPO she entered parliament in 2015 and immediately was appointed as Deputy Minister of Economic and National Planning. After a Cabinet reshuffle in February 2018 she swapped positions with Piet van der Walt and became Deputy Minister of Industrialisation, Trade and SME Development. In March 2020 she was promoted to minister.

Iipumbu is a member both of SWAPO's central committee and its politburo.

Iipumbu holds a bachelor's degree and a master's degree in public administration from the University of Namibia. Before becoming a politician full-time, she served in several administrative positions at the Government Institution Pension Funds (GIPF).

References

1975 births
Living people
People from Omusati Region
21st-century Namibian women politicians
Trade and industry ministers of Namibia
Women members of the National Assembly (Namibia)
Members of the National Assembly (Namibia)
SWAPO politicians
University of Namibia alumni
21st-century Namibian politicians